The 2019 Iowa Hawkeyes football team represented the University of Iowa during the 2019 NCAA Division I FBS football season. The Hawkeyes played their home games at Kinnick Stadium in Iowa City, Iowa, and competed in the West Division of the Big Ten Conference. They were led by Kirk Ferentz in his 21st season as head coach.

Iowa began the year with four straight wins, including an 18–17 road victory over rival Iowa State with College GameDay present. After losing games to three ranked opponents – at No. 19 Michigan (3–10), No. 10 Penn State (12–17), at No. 13 Wisconsin (22–24) – by a total of 14 points, the Hawkeyes knocked off another rival, unbeaten No. 8 Minnesota, 23–19, to start a four-game win streak to close the season. After long-time athletic director Bump Elliott and head coach Hayden Fry died in December, Iowa capped the 2019 season with a resounding 49–24 win over No. 22 USC in the Holiday Bowl. The Hawkeyes finished with a record of 10–3 (6–3 B1G), the sixth season with 10+ wins in the Ferentz era.

Junior kicker Keith Duncan was named Big Ten Kicker of the Year and was selected as a consensus First-team All-American. Junior offensive tackle Tristan Wirfs was named Big Ten Offensive Lineman of the Year, and later became the 10th Iowa player of the Ferentz era taken in the first round of the NFL Draft. After leading the Big Ten in sacks his sophomore season, junior defensive end A. J. Epenesa had a career-high 11.5 sacks in 2019, and was selected in the second round of the 2020 NFL Draft. Michael Ojemudia and Geno Stone became the fourth and fifth Iowa defensive backs drafted between 2017 and 2020. Nate Stanley, a three-year starter at quarterback, was also selected.

Previous season
The 2018 Hawkeyes team finished the season 9–4, 5–4 in Big Ten play to finish in a tie for second place in the West Division. They received an invitation to the Outback Bowl where they defeated Mississippi State.

Preseason

Award watch lists

Preseason Big Ten poll
Although the Big Ten Conference has not held an official preseason poll since 2010, Cleveland.com has polled sports journalists representing all member schools as a de facto preseason media poll since 2011. For the 2019 poll, Iowa was projected to finish in second in the West Division behind Nebraska.

Schedule
Iowa's 2019 schedule began with a non-conference home game against the Miami RedHawks of the Mid-American Conference. Iowa's Big Ten Conference opener was the second week against Rutgers. They finished off their non-conference slate with a road game against in-state rival Iowa State, a member of the Big 12 Conference, and then a home game against Middle Tennessee of Conference USA.

In Big Ten Conference play, Iowa played all members of the West Division and Rutgers, Michigan, and Penn State from the East Division.

Source:

Roster

Rankings

Game summaries

Miami (OH)

Source: Box Score 

Iowa played its first ever season-opening night game. Typical of first games under Ferentz, Iowa started out slow. The offense wasn't clicking for a great deal of the first half, but found a rhythm in the second as Iowa put up four touchdowns. The Hawkeyes had a balanced attack with 252 yards passing and 213 rushing with several running backs.

Rutgers

Source: Box Score

Iowa went to the air early and often in their Big Ten opener. On his second touchdown pass, Nate Stanley passed Ricky Stanzi for third all-time on Iowa's career passing touchdown list. Ihmir Smith-Marsette had a career-high 113 yards receiving and two touchdowns. The Hawkeyes defense was smothering, shutting out the Scarlet Knights and forced three turnovers.

at Iowa State

Source: Box Score

ESPN's College GameDay was in Ames for the rivalry game with Lee Corso picking Iowa State to win the match-up. There were two weather delays in the first half which effectively made it a night game. It ended up being a back-and-forth contest with Iowa kicker Keith Duncan hitting four crucial field goals to keep the Hawkeyes in the game. Iowa held the Cyclones on a critical fourth down, however Iowa State still had a chance with over a minute in regulation. An Iowa state player ran into his teammate attempting to field the punt and it resulted in a muffed ball that Iowa pounced on. With the Cyclones having spent all their timeouts already, the Hawkeyes were simply able to run out the clock and the Cy-Hawk trophy remained in Iowa City for a fifth year in a row.

Middle Tennessee

Source: Box Score 

The Hawkeyes put up 644 yards of total offense (tops in the Ferentz era) as the Blue Raiders were unable to stop them. Toren Young was the most outstanding of the several Iowa backs that were able to play with 131 yards rushing on the day, and Nate Stanley had 276 yards passing and two touchdown passes to Brandon Smith. Iowa dominated ball possession, with almost 12 more minutes and forced the Blue Raiders into several three-and-outs.

at Michigan

Source: Box Score

Penn State

Source: Box Score

The Hawkeyes wore alternate gold jerseys. Iowa entered the game not having defeated Penn State since 2010.

Purdue

Source: Box Score

Purdue refused to go away in a wild second half. Iowa had to recover two onside kick attempts in order to seal this homecoming victory. The Hawkeyes made the Boilermakers one-dimensional as almost all of their offense came through the air. This marked the 300th combined win of the Fry-Ferentz era.

at Northwestern

Source: Box Score 

Iowa entered the game having lost three of the last four games at Ryan Field. The Hawkeyes were able to shut out the Wildcats for the first time since 1981 and spoil their homecoming. Iowa stopped Northwestern on several fourth down attempts to keep them off the board and did not turn the ball over. Nate Stanley also passed Drew Tate to move up to second on Iowa's career passing touchdown list with his 62nd touchdown.

at Wisconsin

Source: Box Score

Wisconsin has won seven of the last eight games in this series. This was the first top 20 match-up between the universities since 2010.

Minnesota

Source: Box Score 

The unbeaten Golden Gophers entered the game with CFP aspirations. Iowa was aggressive in the first half and put up three touchdowns. Minnesota was able to drive the ball but failed to score enough and left Iowa City having not defeated the Hawkeyes at Kinnick Stadium since Kirk Ferentz's first year in 1999. The Hawkeye fans stormed the field, fairly reminiscent of a game three years prior when Iowa knocked off a 9-0 Michigan squad.

Illinois

Source: Box Score

Iowa won its sixth straight in this series, and Illinois hasn't won at Kinnick Stadium since 1999. After a Tyler Goodson touchdown run capped the opening drive, junior kicker Keith Duncan contributed four field goals in a game for the third time this season. On his fourth made kick, Duncan established a new single-season Big Ten record with 27 made field goals. The win over the Illini marked the 96th Big Ten Conference win for head coach Kirk Ferentz, tying him with Hayden Fry.

at Nebraska

Source: Box Score 

After being named a Groza finalist earlier in the week, junior kicker Keith Duncan nailed a 48-yard field goal with one second remaining to clinch the victory (and proceeded to blow kisses towards the Nebraska bench). Junior defensive end A. J. Epenesa anchored the defense with 14 tackles, 4.5 TFL, and 2 sacks. Junior Ihmir Smith-Marsette scored two long touchdowns, and freshman Tyler Goodson ran for 116 yards and a touchdown before leaving with an injury. Epenesa earned Big Ten Defensive Player of the Week for the second time in three weeks, and Duncan was named Big Ten Special Teams Player of the Week for the second straight week and third time this season. The Hawkeyes extended their winning streak in the series to five games overall, and it was Iowa's fourth consecutive road victory against the Cornhuskers.

vs. USC (Holiday Bowl)

Source: Box Score 

Former head coach Hayden Fry passed away just ten days prior to the game and the Iowa helmets were without Tigerhawk decals to honor his legacy on the program. Iowa's 49 points is the most in a bowl game under Ferentz, and the Hawkeyes handed USC its worst bowl loss since the 1948 Rose Bowl. Nate Stanley joined Ricky Stanzi as the second quarterback in Iowa history to win three bowl games, and also passed Drew Tate in career passing yards. Ihmir Smith-Marsette scored three touchdowns in the second quarter – a 6-yard run, 98-yard kickoff return, and 12-yard reception – to earn the game's offensive MVP. The Hawkeyes held USC to just seven points in the second half, led by the game's defensive MVP, A. J. Epenesa.

Awards and honors

Players drafted into the NFL

References

Iowa
Iowa Hawkeyes football seasons
Holiday Bowl champion seasons
Iowa Hawkeyes football